The 1893 All-Ireland Senior Hurling Championship was the seventh staging of the All-Ireland Senior Hurling Championship, the Gaelic Athletic Association's premier inter-county hurling tournament. The championship began on 5 November 1893 and ended on 21 June 1894.

The championship was won by Cork who secured the title following a 6-8 to 0-2 defeat of Kilkenny in the All-Ireland final. This was their 3rd All-Ireland title.

Cork were the defending champions, thus becoming the first team to retain the title.

Results

Leinster Senior Hurling Championship

Munster Senior Hurling Championship

All-Ireland Senior Hurling Championship

Championship statistics

Miscellaneous

 The All-Ireland final between Cork and Kilkenny is the first championship meeting between the two teams.  Cork win the game making them the first team to win back-to-back All-Ireland titles.

Sources

 Corry, Eoghan, The GAA Book of Lists (Hodder Headline Ireland, 2005).
 Donegan, Des, The Complete Handbook of Gaelic Games (DBA Publications Limited, 2005).

References

1893
1893 in hurling